Elections for the London Borough of Merton were held on 3 May 2018 to elect members of Merton London Borough Council in England. This was on the same day as other local elections in England.

Campaign 

In February 2018, Peter Walker, a former Labour councillor for Figges Marsh who was suspended by the party in October 2017, claimed that the local Labour Party was excluding supporters of the national party leader, Jeremy Corbyn, from becoming councillors.

Labour pledged to complete the building of a new leisure centre, bring AFC Wimbledon's home grounds within Merton, consider the introduction of a landlord licensing scheme, establish targets for affordable housing and introduce 20 mph zones.

The Conservatives pledged to reintroduce weekly street cleaning, increase mobile CCTV, deliver a masterplan for Wimbledon, regenerate Morden, establish a 24/7 anti-social behaviour hotline, rebuild St Helier Hospital, introduce borough-wide anti-idling measures and reintroduce webcasting of council meetings.

The Liberal Democrats pledged to institute a target of 50% affordable housing in large developments, install more public bins and public drinking fountains, increase cycling infrastructure, introduce default 20 mph zones, make Raynes Park and Motspur Park railway stations fully accessible, replace the closed walk-in surgery in Mitcham, introduce a levy on planning developments to pay for local schools, scrap charges for the use of Council-owned parks and playing fields, develop incubator sites for start-ups and establish neighbourhood plans.

A key issue during the campaign was the proposed closure of Wimbledon police station by the Labour Mayor of London. The Conservatives proposed to buy the police station, while the Liberal Democrats supported a legal action against the closure. The legal action was brought by Paul Kohler, one of the successful Liberal Democrat candidates for Trinity in the election.

Demolition of Merton Hall 
A key issue during the campaign was the partial demolition of the historic Merton Hall in South Wimbledon, which was given planning permission by the council in September 2017. Under the plans, the Elim Pentecostal Church would assume tenancy of Merton Hall after the year-long works, under the condition that the site could still be hired as a community space by local residents. Elim Church's current High Path site would then become a Harris Federation school hosting 1,200 students from September 2020.

A petition opposing the plans and calling on Historic England to list Merton Hall attracted over 4,000 signatures. The plans attracted national attention in March 2018 over concerns that Elim Church could seek to prevent LGBT groups from hiring Merton Hall. The Conservatives opposed the demolition plans and pledged to end the demolition works immediately if elected; they also alleged that the demolition broke pre-election purdah rules, given that it was using public money on a contentious issue. The Merton Park Ward Residents Association also expressed their regret over the council's plans; their councillors suggested alternative sites for the secondary school and questioned the extent of the demolition required.

The demolition works began in April 2018. In the election, the ward of Abbey, in which Merton Hall is situated, returned one Conservative councillor. After the election, responding to criticism of the plans, council leader Stephen Alambritis claimed that the council is building a brand new hall and not demolishing the existing one. Alambritis confirmed that two investigations were underway, one by the Local Government Ombudsman and another by Ernst and Young.

Results 
Labour retained its control of Merton Council, its majority reduced to four seats. The Conservatives gained two seats from Labour (one each in the wards of Cannon Hill and Abbey) and the Liberal Democrats gained five seats from the Conservatives (two in West Barnes, two in Dundonald and one in Trinity). The Merton Park Ward Residents Association maintained its three councillors in Merton Park. By seat count, this was the best ever election result for the Liberal Democrats in the borough, and the first time they had held council positions outside the West Barnes ward.

Paul Kohler, who achieved significant recognition after leading a legal campaign against the proposed closure of Wimbledon police station, was elected for the Liberal Democrats in Trinity. Two months after the election, his legal action resulted in a judgment that the decision to close the police station was unlawful.

|}

On 11 May 2018, it was announced that the council's cabinet would be reshuffled. Mary Curtin, a Labour councillor for Lower Morden, was voted in as the council's new mayor at the Annual Council Meeting on 23 May 2018.

Ward results

Abbey

Cannon Hill
Following the resignation of Mark Kenny, a by-election was held on 20 June 2019 with the Liberal Democrats gaining the seat.

Colliers Wood

Cricket Green

Dundonald

Figge’s Marsh

Graveney

Hillside

Lavender Fields

Longthornton

Lower Morden

Merton Park

Pollards Hill

Ravensbury

Raynes Park

St Helier

Trinity

Village

West Barnes
On 12 June 2020, Quilliam left the Liberal Democrats and joined the Labour Party.

Wimbledon Park

By-elections

The by-election was triggered by the resignation of Cllr. Mark Kenny of the Labour Party.

The by-election was triggered by the resignation of Cllr. Kelly Braund of the Labour Party.

Notes and references
Notes

References

2018
2018 London Borough council elections